Poplar Lawn Historic District is a national historic district located at Petersburg, Virginia. The district is named after Petersburg's central park (about two city blocks square) which was often a military parade ground in the early 19th century, but became a tent-based detention center and hospital during the American Civil war and later became the site of civic celebrations, including possibly the first Memorial Day, on June 9, 1865. The district also includes 372 contributing buildings, mostly mid- to late-19th-century, single-family residences for middle and upper-middle-class families, some constructed of brick, others weatherboard frame, and later subdivided. Residential architectural styles include Greek Revival, Colonial Revival, Second Empire, and Italianate.  Notable buildings include the Bolling-Zimmer House (c. 1830), St. Stephen's Church (c. 1912), Zion Baptist Church (c. 1880s), William T. Double House (c. 1855), the Waterworks (1856), Dr. Robert Broadnax House (1858), Market Street Methodist Church Parsonage (c. 1905), Maurice Finn House (c. 1904), and the Frank M. D'Alton Double House (c. 1911).

Poplar Lawn Park features a stone basin of uncertain age that is five feet across, and with an oval-shaped depression a foot wide and a foot deep. It is traditionally known as "Pocahontas' bath", though there is no proof she ever used it.

It was listed on the National Register of Historic Places in 1980, with a boundary increase in 2006.

References

Houses on the National Register of Historic Places in Virginia
Historic districts on the National Register of Historic Places in Virginia
Greek Revival architecture in Virginia
Italianate architecture in Virginia
Second Empire architecture in Virginia
Colonial Revival architecture in Virginia
Houses in Petersburg, Virginia
National Register of Historic Places in Petersburg, Virginia